In the field of pedagogy, learning by teaching (German: Lernen durch Lehren, short LdL) is a method of teaching in which students are made to learn material and prepare lessons to teach it to the other students. There is a strong emphasis on acquisition of life skills along with the subject matter. This method was originally defined by Jean-Pol Martin in the 1980s.

Background

The method of having students teach other students has been present since antiquity. Most often this was due to lack of resources.  For example, the Monitorial System was an education method that became popular on a global scale during the early 19th century. It was developed in parallel by  Scotsman Andrew Bell who had worked in Madras and Joseph Lancaster who worked in London; each attempted to educate masses of poor children with scant resources by having older children teach younger children what they had already learned.

Systematic research into intentionally improving education, by having students learn by teaching began in the middle of the 20th century.

In the early 1980s, Jean-Pol Martin systematically developed the concept of having students teach other in the context of learning French as a foreign language, and he gave it a theoretical background in numerous publications.  The method was originally resisted, as the German educational system generally emphasized discipline and rote learning.  However the method became widely used in Germany in secondary education, and in the 1990s it was further formalized and began to be used in universities as well.  By 2008 Martin had retired, and although he remained active Joachim Grzega took the lead in developing and promulgating LdL.

LdL-Method

After preparation by the teacher, students become responsible for their own learning and teaching. The new material is divided into small units and student groups of not more than three people are formed.

Students are then encouraged to experiment to find ways to teach the material to the others. Along with ensuring that students learn the material, another goal of the method, is to teach students life skills like respect for other people, planning, problem solving, taking chances in public, and communication skills. The teacher remains actively involved, stepping in to further explain or provide support if the teaching-students falter or the learning-students do not seem to understand the material.

The method is distinct from tutoring in that LdL is done in class, supported by the teacher, and distinct from student teaching, which is a part of teacher education.

Plastic platypus learning

A related method is the plastic platypus learning or platypus learning technique. This technique is based on evidence that show that teaching an inanimate object improves understanding and knowledge retention of a subject. 
 The advantage of this technique is that the learner does not need the presence of another person in order to teach the subject. The concept is similar to the software engineering technique of rubber duck debugging, in which a programmer can find bugs in their code without the help of others, simply by explaining what the code does, line by line, to an inanimate object such as a rubber duck.

A similar process is the Feynman technique, developed by physicist Richard Feynman, in which a person attempts to write an explanation of some information in a way that a child could understand, developing original analogies where necessary. When the writer reaches an area which they are unable to comfortably explain, they go back and re-read or research the topic until they are able to do so.

Flipped learning + teaching
Traditional instructor teaching style classes can be mixed with or transformed to flipped teaching. Before and after each (traditional/flipped) lecture, anonymized evaluation items on the Likert scale can be recorded from the students for continuous monitoring/dashboarding. In planned flipped teaching lessons, the teacher hands out lesson teaching material one week before the lesson is scheduled for the students to prepare talks. Small student groups work on the lecture chapters instead of homework, and then give the lecture in front of their peers. The professional lecturer then discusses, complements and provides feedback at the end of the group talks. Here, the professional lecturer acts as a coach to help students preparation and live performance.

See also

Peer mentoring
Peer-led team learning

References

Further reading
Adamson, Timothy; Ghose, Debasmita; Shannon C. Yasuda; Jehu, Lucas; Shepard, Silva; Michal, A.; Duan, Jyoce; Scassellati, Brian: „Why We Should Build Robots That Both Teach and Learn". 2021.https://scazlab.yale.edu/sites/default/files/files/hrifp1028-adamsonA.pdf

 m
Kabache, Taieb (2022): Probing the Impact of Learning-by-teaching Method to Boost EFL Learners’ Engagement during the Grammar Session: The case of first-year PEM students at Taleb Abdurrahman ENS Laghouat. Algeria.  
Kolbe, Simon (2021): Learning by Teaching - a Resource Orientated Approach Towards Mordern Inclusive Education. In: Mevlüt Aydogmus (Hg.): New Trends and Promising Directions in Modern Education. New Perspectives 2021. Meram/Konya: Palet Yayinlari Verlag, 234-255.

 m

 (Author copy)

Serholt, Sofia, Ekström Sara, Künster Dennis, Ljungblad Sara, Pareto Lena (2022): Comparing a Robot Tutee to a Human Tutee in a Learning-By-Teaching Scenario with Children, 2022 Front. Robot. AI, 21 February 2022 | https://doi.org/10.3389/frobt.2022.836462

External links
Lernen durch Lehren website, archived 12/2018
Online course (Video): Learning by teaching, Nellie Deutsch, 2017 Learning by teaching, Nellie Deutsch, 2017] Online course (Video): Learning by teaching, Nellie Deutsch, 2017 
Video: Protege effect: Learning by teaching, Ontario 2014
Video: Learning by teaching, Germany 2004
Video: Learning by teaching. Teaching Methodology, ELT under Cover, 2022
Jean-Pol Martin - English Language Teacher Interview #16, ELT Under The Covers Podcast, 2022

Applied learning
Alternative education
Progressivism
Educational practices
Learning methods
Pedagogy